CalculiX is a free and open-source finite-element analysis application that uses an input format similar to Abaqus. It has an implicit and explicit solver (CCX) written by Guido Dhondt and a pre- and post-processor (CGX) written by Klaus Wittig. The original software was written for the Linux operating system. Convergent Mechanical has ported the application to the Windows operating system.

The pre-processor component of CalculiX can generate grid data for the computational fluid dynamics programs duns, ISAAC and OpenFOAM.  It can also generate input data for the commercial FEM programs Nastran, Ansys and Abaqus.  The pre-processor can also generate mesh data from STL files.

There is an active online community that provides support at Discourse. Convergent Mechanical also provides installation support for their extended version of CalculiX for Windows.

There is a friendly CalculiX Launcher with CCX wizard for both Windows and Linux.

Also possible is the Installation in Windows 10 Fall Creator (1709) with the new Linux Subsystem WSL.

A Python library, pycalculix, was written to automate the creation of CalculiX models in the Python programming language. The library provides Python access to building, loading, meshing, solving, and querying CalculiX results for 2D models. Pycalculix was written by Justin Black. Examples and tutorials are available on the pycalculix site.

FreeCAD has developed a FEM workbench that automates the creation of CalculiX models.

There is a lot good examples of use of CalculiX by Prof. Martin Kraska, Brandenburg University of Applied Sciences.

Literature 
 Guido Dhondt: "The Finite Element Method for Three-Dimensional Thermomechanical Applications". Wiley, Hoboken 2004, 
 CCX v2.18 documentation
 CGX v2.18 documentation
 Getting Started Guide
 FreeCAD FEM workbench for CalCulix

References

External links 
 
 Searchable online documentation
 CalculiX for Windows
 CalculiX Discussion Group
 pycalculix website
 FreeCAD FEM workbench
 MFront code generator for CalculiX

Computer-aided engineering software
Free computer-aided design software
Free simulation software
Finite element software for Linux